The NZR G class was a type of Garratt steam locomotive used in New Zealand, later rebuilt as Pacific type locomotives. They were the only Garratt type steam locomotives ever used by the New Zealand Railways (NZR). They were ordered to deal with traffic growth over the heavy gradients of the North Island Main Trunk (NIMT) and to do away with the use of banking engines on steep grades. They were one of the few Garratt designs to employ six cylinders. A mechanical stoker was used to feed coal into the locomotive.

Introduction
About 1913, General Manager E H Hiley considered the importing of ten articulated Garratt engines and ten Pacifics. With the success of the AB class and WAB class Pacifics no more was heard of Garratts. Then with the retirement in 1925 of the Chief Mechanical Engineer E E Gillon his successor G S Lynde invited Beyer, Peacock & Company of England to suggest a suitable Garrett for the NIMT, and they were then asked to quote for engines with either four or six cylinders. But the three six-cylinder engines were supplied "against their own better judgement. The influence of the London & North Eastern Railway three-cylinder enthusiasts (i.e. Lynde) was evident in this unwise decision." These engines had three cylinders on each of the two set of engine frames, thus creating a 6-cylinder Garratt. The engines entered service in 1929.

Walschaerts valve gear operated the outside cylinders with the inner third cylinder operated by a Gresley-Holcroft mechanism. The locomotives proved a disaster on the light NZR tracks. It has been suggested the most likely reason was that the engines were too powerful for the system and also the valve gear mechanisms were complicated. The design was most unusual in that the coal bunker was carried on an extension to the boiler frame rather than the normal Garratt positioning on the rear engine's frame. Unlike a Union Garratt the rear water tank was still mounted on the rear engine unit.

Further, the locomotives when hauling a full load, generated such intense heat in restricted tunnels, which are common in New Zealand, that crews disliked working them. Their large size driving wheels also made them unsuitable for the NIMT. 

The G class were mostly based at Ohakune and operated between Taihape and Ohakune on the NIMT. The central section of the NIMT of 93 miles (153 km) from Taumarunui to Taihape had been relaid with heavier 70 lb/yd (34.8 kg/m) rather than 53 lb/yd (26.3 kg/m) rails in 1901 for the introduction of the heavier NZR X class locomotives.

Withdrawal
Trainloads were reduced and this defeated the purpose for which the Garratts were purchased – namely to operate heavy loads over a vital mainline section of the NIMT route, the central section including the Raurimu Spiral. The trailing engine axle under the cab carried a heavier load than the leading engine trailing axle and experienced continual problems with overheating. Also, the coal bunker carried insufficient fuel in-service and this problem was never remedied because it would have increased the axle loads beyond the light track capabilities.

In 1937 the engines were withdrawn from service. Their numerous design faults sealed the fate of these locomotives when the K class was introduced in 1932.

Rebuilding as Pacifics
Due to the troubles faced with the Garratts in their original form, a proposal was put forward in late 1935 for the three Garratts to be dismantled and the engine units used to build six new 4-6-2 tender locomotives. The three locomotives were dismantled at Hutt Workshops in 1936 and the engine units shipped to Hillside Workshops in Dunedin for eventual rebuilding. The engines as rebuilt were fitted with a new third cylinder, a modified AB class boiler, a new cab and trailing truck based on those used on the Baldwin AA class, and a new Vanderbilt tender based on those used on the AB class, but of welded construction and fitted with roller bearing bogies. The original plate frames were retained as was the Gresley conjugated valve gear.

In service
The first rebuilt locomotive, G 96, was outshopped on 8 September 1937 and dispatched north after initial tests to Christchurch for use on the Midland line. Some minor adjustments were required although the performance of the initial rebuild was deemed satisfactory and the other five engine units were subsequently rebuilt with the last locomotive, G 100, outshopped on 4 March 1938. The rebuilt locomotives were largely used between the Arthur's Pass and Christchurch section of the Midland line on heavy coal haulage during the Second World War and the immediate post war years. The G class worked alongside the six KB class locomotives, and were able to move tonnage which would have required fourteen J class or JA class locomotives.  Only 9 trains in each direction could be run, each way, through the steep  section from Arthur's Pass to Springfield, six regular freight, an extra run as required freight in both directions, the West Coast express three times a week and the overnight perishables mixed train 140/220. The express and perishables were hauled by AB class locomotives, and the remaining freight trains usually by KB class and one or two G class, or sometimes up to three G class. While difficult engines disliked by engine crews, the G class moved huge tonnage in these hard vital years, running more mileage, at lower operating costs than the A or AA classes and in ton miles were outperformed only by the J, JA, AB and KA.

After the introduction in 1939 of the new KB class both the G class and the KB class were trialed on the South Island Limited and mail express on the Main South Line, during the Second World War as far south as Timaru and sometimes to Oamaru and Dunedin, once certain bridges had been strengthened to accept the 14-ton axle loading of the rebuilt G and KB class locomotives. Tests proved the G and KB with their high axle loads, unique complexities as booster or three-cylinder systems more efficiently deployed moving heavy coal trains on the Midland line. 

The G class simply lacked the speed to keep time. While the G class were partly redesigned with express work in mind, they were incapable of more than 50mph, let alone the consistent 60-70mph required to make up time on fast expresses over the Canterbury plains. The G class were often employed on regional stopping passenger trains, such as Christchurch - Ashburton and Christchurch- Springfield, being alright as long as the load was only three to four carriages and a couple of vans and no fast running to make up time was required, with their big (for narrow gauge) 4ft 9 inch drivers, high boiler and Pennsylvania like styling. 

Although powerful, the G class had a low adhesive factor and had issues notably with steam blows created by excessive movement of the thin plate frames. The steam leaks were of particular concern to the Engine drivers, Firemen and Cleaners' Association (EFCA), as was the lack of power-reversing gear, the latter being remediated in 1941 when Ragonnet power-reversing gear was installed. Although said to run well if kept in good repair, the G class were highly unpopular and the EFCA resolved that the class could not be used in regular service after 31 March 1956 due to visibility concerns created by the steam leaks.

Withdrawal
Because the locomotives would need to be radically rebuilt as two-cylinder 4-6-2s, a highly costly proposal which was not seen to be worth the effort, the decision was made to retire the now badly worn-out G class locomotives after reaching a certain mileage. Both G 96 and G 97 were withdrawn in March 1956 as having reached their allotted mileage; the remaining four locomotives remained in service until the end of May 1956 despite their deteriorating condition, owing to the lack of available replacement locomotives.

Despite being withdrawn in 1956, several G class locomotives were not scrapped straight away but remained at Linwood locomotive depot in Christchurch until the early 1960s, when they were broken up for scrap.

See also
 NZR Q class (1901)
 NZR A/AD class (1906)
 NZR AA class
 NZR AB class
 Locomotives of New Zealand

References

Citations

Bibliography

External links

  
 Photo of a Garratt locomotive steaming out of Wellington on preliminary trials
 NZR G class – Garratt
 NZR G class – 4-6-2

G class
Garratt locomotives
4-6-2 locomotives
Beyer, Peacock locomotives
Scrapped locomotives
Railway locomotives introduced in 1928
3 ft 6 in gauge locomotives of New Zealand